Days of Darkness is a compilation double CD released by Spitfire Records.  The first CD is composed of tracks from Testament's Demonic and The Gathering.  The second CD is the entire First Strike Still Deadly album.

Track listing

References

2004 compilation albums
Testament (band) compilation albums
Spitfire Records compilation albums